CS Dinamo București is a professional Romanian rugby union club from Bucharest, which plays in the Liga Națională de Rugby, the first division of Romanian rugby. They are the second most successful rugby union team in Romania with 16 championship titles, 12 cup titles and even a Champions League title to their name.

History
The Dinamo București rugby club was founded in 1949, under the wing of the CS Dinamo București sports club that had been founded by the Romanian Ministry of Internal Affairs the previous year.

Along with Steaua București and Grivița Roșie București (their two local-town rivals), they had dominated the 1950`s scene in Romanian rugby as they won 3 Romanian Championships in 1951, 1952 and 1956, while also winning the Romanian cup twice in 1954 and in 1959.

Located in the nation’s capital, Bucharest, the Dinamo București side had traditionally consisted of members drawn from the ranks of the civil service and/or police. Along with the army side, Steaua, the Dinamo team is one of the nation’s top rugby union outfits.

Honours

Domestic
Liga Națională de Rugby
Winners (16): 1951, 1952, 1956, 1965, 1969, 1982, 1991, 1994, 1996, 1998, 2000, 2001, 2002, 2004, 2007, 2008
Runners-up (2): 2003, 2005

Cupa României 
Winners (12): 1954, 1959, 1980, 1989, 1996, 1997, 1998, 2000, 2001, 2002, 2004, 2008
Runners-up (2): 1981, 2005

European
Champions League (rugby)
Winners (1): 1967

Current squad

See also
 Rugby union in Romania

References

External links
 Official website 
 SuperLiga Squad Details 
 itsrugby.co.uk Squad Details 

Rugby union
Romanian rugby union teams
Rugby clubs established in 1949
1949 establishments in Romania